Post-mortem (meaning "after death") is short for "post-mortem examination", or autopsy, an examination of a corpse in order to determine cause of death.

Post-mortem may also refer to:

Science and technology
 Post-mortem chemistry, a branch of chemistry for studying of chemical and biochemical phenomena in a cadaver
 Post-mortem interval, the time that has elapsed since a person has died
 Post-mortem documentation, a technical analysis of a finished project
 Postmortem studies, a neurobiological research method
 Post-mortem debugging, the debugging of software after it has crashed

Arts, entertainment, and media

Films
 Post Mortem (1982 film), a 1982 Indian Malayalam film 
 Post Mortem (1999 film), a 1999 Canadian film
 Post Mortem (2010 film), a 2010 Chilean film
 Post Mortem (2020 film), a 2020 Hungarian film
 Postmortem (1998 film), a 1998 film starring Charlie Sheen

Literature
 Post-Mortem (Coward play), a 1930 play by Noël Coward
 Post Mortem (Gurney play), a 2006 play by A. R. Gurney
 Post Mortem, a 1968 book by Albert Caraco
 Postmortem (novel), a novel by Patricia Cornwell

Music
 Post Mortem (album), a 2011 album by Black Tide
 Post Mortem (band), a thrash metal band from Boston, Massachusetts
 "Post Mortem", a song from God Is an Astronaut's 2008 self-titled album
 "Postmortem", a song from Slayer's 1986 album, Reign in Blood

Television
 Post Mortem (TV series), a 2007 German crime drama
 Post Mortem: No One Dies in Skarnes a 2021 Norwegian supernatural television series
 "Post Mortem" (House), an episode of the television series House
 "Post Mortem", the seventh episode of the seventh season of CSI: Crime Scene Investigation

Video games
 Post Mortem (video game), a 2002 adventure game

Photography
 Post-mortem photography, a style of photography popular in the 19th century

See also
Autopsy (disambiguation)
Posthumous (disambiguation)